Mahbubul Alam (born 1 December 1983) is a Bangladeshi cricketer who as of 14 August 2009 has played four Tests and four One Day Internationals (ODI). Despite having a first-class batting average of less than seven, Alam scored 59 from 43 deliveries in a One Day International against Zimbabwe in Bulawayo in August 2009.

According to Bangladesh's coach, Champaka Ramanayake, Mahbubul is "a bowler who depends heavily on rhythm".

References

External links

1983 births
Living people
Bangladesh Test cricketers
Bangladesh One Day International cricketers
Bangladeshi cricketers
Dhaka Division cricketers
Dhaka Dominators cricketers
Cricketers at the 2010 Asian Games
Asian Games gold medalists for Bangladesh
Asian Games medalists in cricket
Abahani Limited cricketers
Medalists at the 2010 Asian Games
People from Faridpur District